Comic Book Heroes  is the second studio album by Australian musician Rick Springfield. The album was released on September 17, 1973, by Wizard Records. In the U.S. this album was first issued on Capitol Records (SMAS-11206), then quickly withdrawn (because of legal proceedings) and subsequently issued on the Columbia Records label (KC-32704).

Reception
Cash Box magazine said "This collection of eleven original compositions produced by Robie Porter ranges from the heavy rocker 'I'm Your Superman' to the polished and full Weep No More'. 'Misty Water Woman' and 'The Liar' are splendid examples of Rick's songwriting virtuosity as each reflects several contiguous textures that are rough and refined alternately. This LP is well worth getting into."

Track listing
All tracks composed by Rick Springfield

Charts

References

1973 albums
Rick Springfield albums
Songs about comics
Songs about superheroes